Coomera Indoor Sports Centre is an Australian entertainment and sporting arena which was built on the Gold Coast, Queensland.

History and construction
On 12 November 2011, it was announced that the Gold Coast would host the 2018 Commonwealth Games. The Gold Coast bid included an indoor facility in Coomera that would hold a capacity of 2500 people and would host the Wrestling event. The bid also included the creation of the 7500-seat arena to be built in Southport. On 13 June 2014, the 2018 Commonwealth Games masterplan was finalised and the release revealed a new 7500-seat indoor arena to be built in Coomera. The arena will measure 10,000 square-metres and construction will be complete in 2016. The venue will be used for Volleyball in the 2032 Summer Olympics and Wheelchair Rugby for the 2032 Summer Paralympics.

Sporting events 
The arena hosted the netball and gymnastics events during the 2018 Commonwealth Games.

See also 

 Sports on the Gold Coast, Queensland
 Venues of the 2018 Commonwealth Games

References 

Indoor arenas in Australia
Sports venues on the Gold Coast, Queensland
2018 Commonwealth Games venues
Netball venues in Queensland
Gymnastics venues
2016 establishments in Australia
Sports venues completed in 2016
Wrestling venues
Venues of the 2032 Summer Olympics and Paralympics
Gymnastics at the 2018 Commonwealth Games
Netball at the 2018 Commonwealth Games